The Killer is the 2012 album by German techno musician Shed.

Track listing

References

2012 albums
Shed (musician) albums